The tapu resmi was a feudal land tax in the Ottoman Empire.

A tapu was the equivalent of a title deed for farmland, in a feudal system where farmers were proprietors rather than outright owners; this would be recorded in a tapu tahrir, a survey of land ownership and land grants which the Ottoman government used to update land-tax records, and which are now valuable to historians. Not all land was subject to the tapu system; iltizam tax-farming was more commonly applied to non-tapu land. A prominent 16th-century legal theorist argued that tapu resmi was contrary to shari'ah law, and was effectively a bribe; however, tapu resmi continued to be used across the Ottoman Empire. 

Tapu resmi was a divani tax on these land titles, payable to the timar holder. Because land inherited land was subject to a change of title, tapu resmi could also be seen as an inheritance tax; but the tapu resmi fee was payable on other transfers too, including when farmland fell vacant because a tenant farmer died or left. After paying tapu resmi, a farmer would still have to pay resm-i çift (or an equivalent tax) each year.

Land which was newly brought under cultivation, such as ifrazat, would be exempt from tapu resmi until the next tahrir (survey).

In 1716, a kanunname (tax code) for the vilayet of Morea set a sliding scale of tapuu resmi fees, from 20 akçes for low-quality land to 60 akçe for high-quality land; this was categorised as a bad-i hava tax, along with adet-i deştbani. 

The tapu system was partially reformed during the tanzimat; including increased gender equality, so that women could work, or rent out, farmland; responsibility for collecting the tapu resmi passed to dedicated treasury officers rather than feudal lords, and documents were standardised in the 1840s.

References

Taxation in the Ottoman Empire
Land management in the Ottoman Empire